Lars Gunnar Åberg (born 5 May 1940), known professionally as Lasse Åberg, is a Swedish actor, musician, film director and artist. Between 1960 and 1964 he studied at the Konstfack department of graphic design.

Åberg has produced some of the most successful films in Sweden, depicting "typical" Swedish life and customs in a usually humorous way. Åberg's character can be described as an inept outsider with a large heart, constantly pushed aside without noticing.

His films have generated over 300 million Swedish kronor (~43 million USD) in Sweden alone; no large scale international distribution has ever been attempted. His 1980 film Sällskapsresan entered into the 12th Moscow International Film Festival.

As an artist, he is famous for making various lithographs; one of his stocks in trade are sketchy Mickey Mouse drawings. He is a member of Svenska Serieakademien. He also re-designed the seat textiles for the Stockholm Metro subway in the 1990s.

As a musician, he played in the nationally successful band Electric Banana Band. Åberg is also the creator of Trazan & Banarne, one of the most beloved Swedish children's shows ever. It was shown on Sveriges Television in the late 1970s/early 1980s. The characters of the show, Trazan Apansson (Åberg) and Banarne (Klasse Möllberg) are also members of the Electric Banana Band.

At the 17th Guldbagge Awards he won the Ingmar Bergman Award. At the 27th Guldbagge Awards he won the award for Best Actor for his role in Den ofrivillige golfaren.

Filmography

Film

Television

Bibliography

References

External links 

New York Times entry
Åbergs Museum

1940 births
Living people
People from Hofors Municipality
Swedish male actors
Swedish film directors
Konstfack alumni
Swedish male musicians
Swedish artists
Best Actor Guldbagge Award winners